Nyege Nyege is a collective in Kampala, Uganda that promotes outsider music, primarily electronic, by African artists. It was founded in 2013 by expats Arlen Dilsizian and Derek Debru. In addition to organizing ongoing parties and an artist residency, the collective runs two record labels and a multi-day annual festival. Its name refers to a Luganda word describing "a sudden, uncontrollable urge to dance."

History 
Debru was born in Burundi but grew up in Belgium, moving to Uganda in 2010 to teach at the Kampala Film School.  Dilsizian is Greco-Armenian and studied ethnomusicology before relocating to Kampala, also in 2010. In 2013, the two began throwing a party called Boutiq Electronique at late-night club Tilapia. Unlike other local parties, which played mainstream dancehall, reggae, and hip-hop, Boutiq was focused on African genres like kuduro and coupé-décalé. As the party's audience and reach grew, Debru and Dilsizian opened a recording studio in 2015 and began an artist residency to foster producers throughout Africa.

Artists affiliated with Nyege Nyege have toured throughout Europe and Asia, playing festivals including CTM and Unsound. The 2019 edition of Red Bull Music Festival in New York featured a night dedicated to the collective, although the two Nyege Nyege artists slated to perform, MCZO and Duke, were forced to cancel after customs agents denied them entry into the U.S.

Festival 

Since 2015, the collective has organized the Nyege Nyege Festival, a multi-day, multi-stage event at an abandoned riverfront resort in Jinja. South African telecom company MTN has sponsored the festival since 2017, with the name changing officially to MTN Nyege Nyege. At 9,000 attendees, it is the biggest electronic music festival in East Africa. In 2018, Uganda's main tourism trade group named the festival the best overall tourism event of the year, repeating the award in 2019. Resident Advisor and FACT have named it one of the world's best electronic festivals.

The lineup focuses on East African artists, many affiliated with Nyege Nyege Tapes. It also includes performers and DJs from outside the continent, including Juan Atkins, Suzi Analogue, and DJ Scotch Egg, whose music is influenced by African sounds. British online radio station NTS brought a contingent of DJs to the 2017 festival, and streaming platform Boiler Room has hosted a stage since 2018.

Controversies 
The festival has received backlash from Uganda's religious right over its affiliation with the LGBT community and attraction of tourists. Locals distributed pamphlets condemning the event in 2016, and in 2018, Uganda's minister of ethics attempted to cancel that year's edition, claiming  the event would "compromise national integrity" and put citizens "at risk of deviant sexual immorality" but was overruled by the minister of the interior.
The event has continued to grow and the latest edition sponsored by Uganda Waragi is the biggest it has ever been. With over 60,000 attendees, Nyege Nyege is now evidently the biggest regional dance festival.Unlike the previous editions, the 2022 Nyege Nyege changed venue to Itanda falls

Labels 
In 2016 Debru and Dilsizian founded Nyege Nyege Tapes to release regional, non-commercial African music for a wider audience. Some releases are home productions that digitally recreate traditional music like chakacha, while others are influenced by Western electronic genres like techno and trap. The catalogue also includes field recordings by Debru and Dilsizian of tribal performers, many of whom had not been previously recorded. All profits are split evenly between the label and the artist. Physical copies of cassettes are limited and most are out of print, although the music is available digitally on Bandcamp. In 2019, Nyege Nyege added an all-digital label, Hakuna Kulala, focusing on club and experimental genres.

References

External links 
 Nyege Nyege festival

East African music
African record labels
Electronic music festivals
Electronic music record labels